During the 1977–78 Scottish football season, Celtic competed in the Scottish Premier Division.

Competitions

Scottish Premier Division

League table

Matches

Scottish Cup

Scottish League Cup

European Cup

References

Celtic F.C. seasons
Celtic